Joseph Kushner (né Berkowitz; 10 October 1922 – 5 October 1985) was a Belarusian-born American real estate investor and developer. At the end of his career, he owned over 4,000 apartments, houses, and properties.

Biography
Kushner was born Joseph Berkowitz on 10 October 1922 in Navahrudak (Polish: Nowogródek), in what was then eastern Poland. His parents were Chana and Moshe Berkowitz. In August 1945, he married Reichel "Rae" Kushner (27 February 1923 – 2004) in Budapest. Rae Kushner was also from the city of Navahrudak, and is remembered for accompanying her brother and up to 360 others to escape through a tunnel from the Navahrudak Ghetto. Joseph took his wife’s last name upon marriage. Charles Kushner was the chief benefactor of the Museum of Jewish Resistance. In the aftermath of the war, Navahrudak was transferred from Poland to the Byelorussian SSR of the Soviet Union under territorial changes dictated by the Potsdam Agreement. Rae Kushner and her spouse immigrated to the United States as Sh'erit ha-Pletah from the Soviet Union in 1949.

Kushner worked as a carpenter in New Jersey eventually running his own business which was funded by the G.I. Bill and later by the Federal Aid Highway Act of 1956.

The Joseph Kushner Hebrew Academy and the Rae Kushner Yeshiva High School, both in Livingston, New Jersey, are named in their honour.

Family
Kushner was the father of Esther Schulder, Murray Kushner and Charles Kushner, and the grandfather of Jared Kushner, Joshua Kushner, and Marc Kushner.

See also
Kushner family

References

1922 births
1985 deaths
20th-century American businesspeople
20th-century American Jews
Polish Jews
American people of Polish-Jewish descent
American people of Belarusian-Jewish descent
Joseph
Place of birth missing
Polish emigrants to the United States
Soviet emigrants to the United States